Miss Earth 2020, the 20th anniversary of the Miss Earth pageant, the first virtual coronation of any major pageant in the world. The pageant was held on 29 November 2020 where Miss Earth 2019 Nellys Pimentel of Puerto Rico was succeeded by Lindsey Coffey of the United States at the end of the event. This marked the first time a delegate representing the United States won Miss Earth, becoming the fourth country to win all of the Big Four international beauty pageants at least once.

In the same event, other elemental winners were also crowned: Stephany Zreik of Venezuela won Miss Earth – Air, Roxanne Baeyens of the Philippines as Miss Earth – Water, and Michala Rubinstein of Denmark as Miss Earth – Fire. Miss Australia Brittany Dickson, a brain cancer survivor received the Eco Angel Special Award, the equivalent of Beauty for a Cause award.

Delegates from 84 countries and territories participated in this year's competition.

The pageant was hosted by James Deakin and telecast on TV5 and FOXlife, with a virtual tour of the world in the opening number and featured the delegates in their eco-angel and respective national costumes.

The coronation show guest performers were international violinist Iskandar Widjaja and Latin American singer and TV host Patricia Zavala.

Background
The pageant started on 21 September 2020 and ran for a couple of months. On 12 October 2020, the organization held a "Getting to Know You" virtual meet and greet with each delegate hosted by former Miss Earth 2008 Karla Henry. The pageant preliminary was streamed online on virtual channel KTX on 24 November 2020.

The COVID-19 pandemic caused travel restrictions would have the contestants to travel to the Philippines and would be forced to subject on a 14-day quarantine period upon arrival in that country. It was announced on 14 August 2020, the Miss Earth Organization would have to crown their new titleholders on a virtual coronation night scheduled for 29 November 2020 for the first time in the organization's history, such occurrence a major beauty pageant held virtually from the participants' home countries for the first time since the inception of beauty pageants dated back to the 1920s.

The candidates were split into four continental groups: Asia & Oceania, Africa, Americas, and Europe and then competed in the following categories: Earth Talk, Talent, Evening Gown, Swimsuit, Sports Wear, National Costume, and Interview with Netizens. The preliminary judging categories are: Beauty of Face, Fitness, and Environmental Awareness.

Results

 Miss Earth
 Miss Earth – Air
 Miss Earth – Water
 Miss Earth – Fire
 Top 8
 Top 20

Final results

§ – Best Eco-Video winners automatically advanced to Top 20.

Pre-pageant activities

Medalists

Judges 
 Patricia Zavala – Latin American singer and TV host
 Hassan Eltigani Malik – President of United Nations Industrial Development Organization
 Natalia Barulich – International DJ, model, and singer
 Iskandar Widjaja – Violinist
 Jewel Lobaton – Former Binibining Pilipinas Universe 1998 and CEO, Founder, & Owner of Jewel Beauty Strong
 Michael Ma – Restaurateur, Environmentalist, Founder, & CEO of Indochine Group
 Lorraine Schuck – Former Miss Asia Quest 1979 1st runner-up & Executive Vice President, Carousel Productions.

Delegates
84 contestants from various countries and territories have been selected to participate in the Miss Earth 2020 pageant.

References

External links
 

2020
2020 beauty pageants
2020 in the Philippines
Events affected by the COVID-19 pandemic
Impact of the COVID-19 pandemic on television